The 56th Bodil Awards were held on 2 March 2003 in the Imperial Cinema in Copenhagen, Denmark, honouring the best national and foreign films of 2002. Susanne Bier's Open Hearts took three awards, winning Best Danish Film as well as the awards for Best leading Actor Actress which went to Nikolaj Lie Kaas and Paprika Steen respectively. Paprika Steen also won the award for Best Actress in a Leading Role for her performance in Okay, while Jens Albinus won Best Actor in a Leading Role. The David Lynch film Mulholland Drive was named Best American Film and Almodovar's Talk to Her the Best Non-American Film. Kim Fupz Aakeson, Anders Thomas Jensen and Mogens Rukov collectively received a Bodil Honorary Award for their work as screenwriters.

Winners and nominees

Best Danish Film 
 Open Hearts – Susanne Bier
 Okay – Jesper W. Nielsen
 Facing the Truth – Nils Malmros
 Minor mishaps – Annette K. Olesen
 Wilbur Wants to Kill Himself

Best Actor in a Leading Role 
 Jens Albinus – Facing the Truth
 Ole Ernst Okay
 Jørgen Kiil – Minor Mishaps
 Mads Mikkelsen – Opens Hearts

Best Actress in a Leading Role 
 Paprika Steen – Okay
 Sonja Richter – Opens Hearts
 Maria Würgler Rich – Minor Mishaps
 Maria Bonnevie – I Am Dina

Best Actor in a Supporting Role 
 Nikolaj Lie Kaas – Open Hearts
 Jesper Christensen – Okay
 Jesper Christensen – Minor Mishaps
 Henrik Pripp – Minor Mishaps Best Actress in a Supporting Role 
 Paprika Steen – Opens Hearts Julia Davis – Wilbur Wants to Kill Himself Jannie Faurschou – Minor Mishaps Birthe Neumann – Opens Hearts Best American Film 
 Mulholland Drive In the Bedroom Gosford Park The Man Who Wasn't There The Royal Tenenbaums Best Non-American Film 
 Talk to Her The Man Without a Past Yi Yi Y Tu Mamá También  The Piano Teacher''

See also 

 2003 Robert Awards

References 

2002 film awards
Bodil Awards ceremonies
2003 in Copenhagen
March 2003 events in Europe